Jayson Green may refer to:

 Jayson Green, member of hardcore punk band Orchid
 Jayson Greene, American music critic, editor and memoirist